Buchheim is a municipality  in Baden-Württemberg, Germany

Buchheim may also refer to:

People
Buchheim (surname)

Places
Buchheim, Cologne, Germany
The former name of Bad Lausick